William Carter (died 1895) was a stationer and a manufacturer of ink in Boston, Massachusetts, United States.

Carter rented a store from his uncle to sell paper and gradually added ink wells and ink to his inventory. 
Carter became a repackager of inks manufactured by other companies in 1858, but later began to make his own inks around the time of the American Civil War when his source of ink, the firm of Tuttle and Moore, dissolved.  Carter was joined by other relatives in his enterprise, giving rise to a number of different firms that ultimately became Carter's Ink Company.

The first new ink product was a combined writing and copier ink.

External links  
  Carter Ink Company

1895 deaths
Businesspeople from Boston
American stationers
20th-century American businesspeople
19th-century American businesspeople